Coenobiodes acceptana is a species of moth of the family Tortricidae. It is found in China (Zhejiang, Anhui, Guizhou) and Japan (Honshu).

The wingspan is about 16 mm.

References

	

Moths described in 1973
Eucosmini